William Rich Weir (23 August 1874 – 8 July 1955) was a former Australian rules footballer who played with Carlton in the Victorian Football League (VFL). 

After football, he qualified as a pharmacist and commenced work as a chemist in Williamstown. He later enlisted in the Australian Army to fight in the Boer War, and was awarded the Queen's South Africa Medal.

Notes

External links 
		
Bill Weir's profile at Blueseum

1874 births
1955 deaths
Australian rules footballers from Victoria (Australia)
Carlton Football Club (VFA) players
Carlton Football Club players
People educated at Scotch College, Melbourne
Australian military personnel of the Second Boer War